The following highways are numbered 191:

Canada
New Brunswick Route 191
  Quebec Route 191

Japan
 Japan National Route 191

Philippines
 N191 highway (Philippines)

United States
 U.S. Route 191
 Alabama State Route 191
 Arkansas Highway 191
 California State Route 191
 Connecticut Route 191
 Florida State Road 191 (former)
 Georgia State Route 191
 Iowa Highway 191
 K-191 (Kansas highway)
 Kentucky Route 191
 Maine State Route 191
 Maryland Route 191 
 M-191 (Michigan highway) (former)
Montana Highway 191 (former)
 New York State Route 191
 North Carolina Highway 191
 Ohio State Route 191
 Pennsylvania Route 191
 South Carolina Highway 191
 Tennessee State Route 191
 Texas State Highway 191
 Texas State Highway Spur 191
 Farm to Market Road 191 (Texas)
 Utah State Route 191
 Vermont Route 191
 Virginia State Route 191
 Wisconsin Highway 191
 Wyoming Highway 191
Territories
 Forest Highway 191 (Puerto Rico)